The 2006 Malaysian motorcycle Grand Prix was the thirteenth round of the 2006 MotoGP Championship. It took place on the weekend of 8–10 September 2006 at the Sepang International Circuit.

This was the last MotoGP round to be sponsored by a tobacco company.

MotoGP classification

250 cc classification

125 cc classification

Championship standings after the race (MotoGP)

Below are the standings for the top five riders and constructors after round thirteen has concluded.

Riders' Championship standings

Constructors' Championship standings

 Note: Only the top five positions are included for both sets of standings.

References

Malaysian motorcycle Grand Prix
Malaysia
Motorcycle Grand Prix